The Robert E. Howard Museum is located at the junction of Texas State Highway 36 and Avenue J in Cross Plains, in the county of Callahan, in the U.S. state of Texas. The museum was the family home of author Robert E. Howard, creator of Conan the Barbarian.  The structure was added to the National Register of Historic Places listings in Callahan County, Texas  in 1994.

History
The T-shaped white frame home was built c.1919, by Mr. and Mrs. J.M.Coffman. Dr. Isaac M. Howard and his wife Hester Ervin Howard bought it shortly thereafter. Their son Robert was a teenager when they moved into the home. A bathroom and rear porch were added by Dr. Howard. Robert E. Howard committed suicide in his car in the driveway of the house in 1936. His father sold the house in 1944 to Mrs. Nancy Elizabeth Grisham.

Museum
The amateur Robert E. Howard Press Association and the non-profit Robert E. Howard Foundation sponsor an annual event in June to celebrate the author's legacy. The local library extends its hours during the event to make its Howard publications and memorabilia available to the public.

Visitors to the museum may read Howard's suicide note, a copy of which is on display with his typewriter.

Hours, admission
Admission only by pre-arrangement.

See also

List of museums in West Texas
Robert E. Howard bibliography
National Register of Historic Places listings in Callahan County, Texas

References

External links

Robert E. Howard Foundation
Robert E. Howard Press Association

Historic house museums in Texas
Houses completed in 1919
Robert E. Howard
Houses on the National Register of Historic Places in Texas
Museums in Callahan County, Texas
Howard, Robert
Houses in Callahan County, Texas
National Register of Historic Places in Callahan County, Texas